Tucson Arizona has had several baseball teams in the minor league Pacific Coast League, including:

Tucson Toros, 1969–1997
Tucson Sidewinders, 1998–2008
Tucson Padres, 2011–2012, planned to relocated to El Paso